Samuel George Dalby (born 7 December 1999) is an English professional footballer who plays for Wrexham as a striker.

Club career

Leyton Orient
Dalby made his debut for Leyton Orient in the 3–1 win over Stevenage in the EFL Trophy on 30 August 2016, coming on as a substitute for Jordan Bowery. He became one of the youngest Orient players in the club's history, aged 16 years and 226 days.

After scoring 11 goals in 19 appearances for Orient's U18 side, Dalby signed a professional contract with the club in December 2016. He made his league debut as a second-half substitute for Robbie Weir in the 1–0 defeat at Wycombe Wanderers on 17 December 2016.

Dalby made his full debut in the Leyton Orient starting eleven against Crawley Town in League Two on 26 December 2016, also scoring the first goal in the 3–2 win. After impressing in his debut season at Orient, he went on trial at Premier League side Crystal Palace in the summer of 2017.

Leeds United
On 23 January 2018, Dalby was signed by EFL Championship side Leeds United for an undisclosed fee on a two-and-a-half year contract. On 19 March, Dalby impressed for Leeds Under 23's in a victory against Ipswich, with it being described as a 'coming of age performance', after scoring his 4th goal in 6 games for the Leeds United Under 23's squad.

On 3 March 2018, Dalby was named in Leeds' first team for their travelling squad for Leeds EFL Championship game against Fulham at Craven Cottage, however he was not named amongst the substitutes. On 8 May, he was named in Leeds' first team squad by Head Coach Paul Heckingbottom for their post season friendlies tour to Myanmar.

Dalby scored his first goal for Leeds' first team when he scored for Leeds under new head coach Marcelo Bielsa in their pre-season friendly 1–1 draw against York City on 20 July 2018. On 26 July 2018, Dalby was given the number 41 shirt for the upcoming 2018–19 season for Leeds.

On 31 January 2019, Dalby joined League Two side Morecambe on loan until the end of the season. He made his debut on 9 February in a 3–2 defeat against Bury and in total made 2 substitute appearances.

Watford
On 12 July 2019, Dalby joined Premier League club Watford for an undisclosed fee, signing a two-year deal with an additional one-year option. He will be part of their development squad during the 2019–20 season. On 28 July 2019, Dalby scored a hat-trick whilst playing for Watford U23's against a RB Leipzig U19 side in a friendly match. He was also selected in the matchday squad for Watford's EFL Cup fourth round defeat to Everton on 29 October 2019, but ultimately remained an unused substitute.

On 19 February 2021, Dalby joined National League side Stockport County on loan for one month.

On 22 March 2021, Dalby returned to the National League to join Woking on loan for the remainder of the campaign.

On 18 May 2021, it was announced that Dalby would leave Watford upon the expiry of his contract in June.

Southend United
On 28 July 2021, Dalby was announced to have joined recently relegated National League side Southend United on a two-year deal.

Wrexham
On 1 August 2022, Dalby signed for Wrexham for an undisclosed fee on a two-year deal with the option for a further year. 

On 16 August 2022, Dalby made his debut for the club coming on off the bench in a 2–0 defeat to Chesterfield.

On 24 September 2022, Dalby scored his first goal for Wrexham in a 6–0 home victory against Torquay.

On 6 November 2022, Dalby scored his first ever FA Cup goal in a 3–0 win against Oldham Athletic where he also got an assist.

Style of play
Dalby's style of play has been likened to English Striker Harry Kane, due to his stature, finishing and hold up play. He was described as a special talent, with former Orient teammate James Dayton describing him 'He's left-footed, has a lovely touch and he's very aware of space. He is very natural at taking the ball into space and away from pressure'.

Career statistics

References

External links

1999 births
Living people
People from Leytonstone
English footballers
Association football forwards
Leyton Orient F.C. players
Leeds United F.C. players
Morecambe F.C. players
Watford F.C. players
Stockport County F.C. players
Woking F.C. players
Southend United F.C. players
Wrexham A.F.C. players
English Football League players
National League (English football) players